James J. Walker may refer to:

 Jimmy Walker (1881–1946), mayor of New York City, 1926–1932
 James J. Walker (American football), American college football player and coach
 James John Walker (entomologist) (1851–1939), English entomologist
 James John Walker (1846–1922), businessman, see J. W. Walker & Sons Ltd, organ makers